The Maryland Congressional elections of 2004 were held on Tuesday, November 2, 2004.  The terms of all eight Representatives to the United States House of Representatives expired on January 3, 2005, and therefore all were put up for contest. The winning candidates served a two-year term from January 3, 2005, to January 3, 2007.

Overview

District 1

District 2

District 3

District 4

District 5

District 6

District 7

District 8

References

See also

Maryland
2004
2004 Maryland elections